Essential Mix: Classic Edition is an album released by Grandmaster Flash. It was released in 2002 and features Grandmaster Flash remixing classic club and dance tunes into a constant megamix.

Track listing
"Intro" – Grandmaster Flash – 0:31
"I Can't Wait" – Nu Shooz – 1:59
"I Found Lovin'" – The Fatback Band – 4:45
"Before I Let Go" – Maze featuring Frankie Beverly – 4:27
"We Got the Funk" – Positive Force – 1:00
"Rapture" – Blondie – 2:56
"Last Night a DJ Saved My Life" – Indeep – 3:24
"Cavern" – Liquid Liquid – 2:45
"I'll Do Anything For You" – Denroy Morgan – 6:02
"Bra" – Cymande – 1:50
"Walking on Sunshine" – Rockers Revenge – 2:55
"Rock Your World" – Weeks & Co. – 3:17
"Love Is the Message" – MFSB featuring The Three Degrees – 1:42
"Give It Up Or Turnit A Loose" – James Brown – 4:57
"It's Just Begun" – Jimmy Castor Bunch – 2:34
"You're the One for Me" – D. Train – 4:03
"Planet Rock" – Afrika Bambaataa & Soul Sonic Force – 7:11

References

2002 compilation albums